Radio AAHS was a radio network managed by the Children's Broadcasting Corporation.

Its flagship station was WWTC (1280 AM) in Minneapolis, which broadcast from the former First Federal Bank building at Minnesota State Highway 100 and Excelsior Boulevard in St. Louis Park. At its height in 1996, Radio AAHS had 29 affiliates across the nation. Founder Christopher Dahl had purchased WWTC in 1990 and created an outlet for children's music, specifically targeted at listeners 5 to 10. The musical format had songs from children's films, but also created a niche for songs recorded specifically to entertain children. The programming was driven, in large part, by listener requests, and many of the choices were little known outside that audience.

History
Children's Broadcasting Corp. was founded by Christopher Dahl in 1990 with the idea for a children's radio network, Radio AAHS. That year a company of Dahl's purchased WWTC 1280 AM in Minneapolis. Dahl ran the Radio AAHS format on that station as a test run for two years. With Arbitron not tracking kids under 12, Dahl had commissioned such a survey from Arbitron to determine its weekly listeners in 1993, which the survey indicated 90,000.

With the survey in hand, Dahl took Children's Broadcasting Corp. public. Radio AAHS then went national focusing on the country's top 100 markets. In late 1994, the company was attempting to raise $20 million partly to purchase stations in New York and Chicago. Children's Broadcasting Corp. and a music division of Time Warner Inc. launched in February 1995 a monthly magazine with a companion CD.

In 1996 Radio AAHS signed a deal with Disney to further develop the children's radio idea. Disney was to sell ads and help grow Radio AAHS through its recently purchased ABC Radio in addition to helping develop Radio AAHS. "These guys started out right from the beginning to deceive us,"  stated Dahl later. For proof, Dahl cited Disney Director of Strategic Planning & Development Lynn Kesterson-Townes saying "she informed Children's that her job at Disney for the next six months was to learn all she could regarding Children's operations."

In the nine months of the deal, CBC claimed, Disney sold only $23,000 in ads and recruited no new affiliates. In a later lawsuit, CBC's lawyers detailed a deposition from eventual Radio Disney manager Scott McCarthy, who said in the document that he instructed his staff to meet only certain contractual minimums.

The deal with Disney finally fell apart in a meeting on June 21, 1996, when then-ABC President David Kantor told CBC that Disney would not exercise its warrants and that it was close to starting its own kids' network. On July 30, Disney formally canceled the contract and announced it was starting its own kids network. Following that announcement Disney quickly informed Radio AAHS that it was no longer allowed to broadcast from Disney theme parks.

Disney's launch of its own, CHR-oriented children's network, Radio Disney, spelled the demise of Radio AAHS.  Children's Broadcasting Corporation was unable to compete with Disney's name recognition and resources. After briefly renaming itself AAHS World Radio, the network discontinued programming in January 1998.  The corporation broadcast a mix of random music and paid-programming (6am-6pm CT) and Beat Radio, a dance/club music format (6pm-6am CT), until its ten company-owned stations could be sold. The sale of the stations was completed in late October 1998 to Catholic Family Radio.

Following the shuttering of the network, some of the Radio Aahs staff joined XM Kids, the children's channel of XM Satellite Radio, which launched in late 2001.

In 2002, Children's Broadcasting won a lawsuit against Disney for $9.5 million in damages, with the judgment becoming final in 2004. The assets of Radio AAHS were rolled into Intelefilm Corp. The business changed its focus to provision of digital services and products, but soon filed for Chapter 11 bankruptcy. The award of $12.4 million from Disney was used to pay creditors following liquidation of the insolvent company.

Programming
A sample hour of music early in 1995 included "I Just Can't Wait to Be King" (from The Lion King soundtrack) by Jason Weaver; "Don't Rock the Jukebox" by The Chipmunks and Alan Jackson; "Thank You" by Boyz II Men; "The Missing Parade" by Tom Chapin; "She Drives Me Crazy" by Kermit the Frog and Miss Piggy; and "Help!" by Little Texas.

Network programming began with a morning show, The All-American Alarm Clock (which was introduced by the Craig Taubman song, "Good Morning" at the top of the hour from 6 to 11 ET), and continued with music throughout the day, as well as a feature of News for Kids, skits, jokes and stories. The network grew by creating original content at a regional level and then serving out the shows to the network at-large. One program, The Toy Talk Show, was produced by Pangea Corporation and hosted by the three directors of the company, John Besmehn, John Schulte and Cheryl Ann Wong, during which children would call in and ask questions about toys, animation and new video games. Programs like the Toy Talk Show were a model for the network for several years, where producers would create and deliver both content and sponsorships for their airtime. With increased production costs, lackluster ratings and the juggernaut of Disney Radio attracting larger audiences and more sponsorship dollars, the shift away from original children's programming required the network to find an alternative approach to content creation.

Advertising revenue for the network came from sponsors such as Disney, Mattel and General Mills. During 1995–96, the network's magazine included a CD or tape of Radio AAHS favorites as part of the subscription. As the internet grew in popularity and children were afforded more access to it, Radio AAHS signed a content carriage agreement with NetRadio, a once rising and popular site for internet radio programming. The intent was to increase ad blocks for both the traditional radio network and the internet affiliation. As part of its expansion and vision, NetRadio was eager to attract a children's audience, due to the amount of advertising dollars that are spent on that demographic.

Affiliates
In addition to flagship station WWTC in Minneapolis, Radio AAHS was broadcast on AM stations nationwide and on an FM station in Spokane. After five years, Radio AAHS had 27 affiliates. 30 percent of the United States was served by the format by early 1995, and the hope was to cover nearly half the country by the end of the year. Many of the stations had call letters that reflected the programming for children:

KYYD 1340 (Abilene, TX)
KDZZ 1520 (Albuquerque, NM)
KYAK 650 (Anchorage, AK)
WKDB 1570 (Baltimore, MD)
WAZS 980 (Charleston, SC)
WAUR 930 (Chicago, IL)
WAOZ 1360 (Cincinnati, OH)
KAHZ 1360 (Dallas/Ft. Worth TX)
KKYD 1340 (Denver, CO)
KKSO 1390 (Des Moines, IA)
WDOZ 1310 (Detroit, MI)
WCAR 1090 (Detroit, MI)
WEIO 1050 (Eau Claire, WI)
KDUK 1280 (Eugene, OR)
WISZ 640 (Grand Rapids, MI)
WISZ 810 (Grand Rapids, MI)
WLWZ 1360 (Greenville, SC)
WSYW 810 (Indianapolis, IN)
WJAX 1220 (Jacksonville, FL)
KCAZ 1480 (Kansas City, MO)
KDYS 1520 (Lafayette, LA)
KKDD 1400 (Las Vegas, NV)
KPLS 830 (Los Angeles/Orange CA)
WKDV 1460 (Manassas, VA)
WOWW 1430 (Memphis, TN)
WHOZ 660 (Mobile, AL)
KMUS 1380 (Muskogee, OK)
WJDM 1660 (Elizabeth, NJ - New York City area)
WZKD 950 (Orlando, FL)
KLZE 95.3 (Owensville, MO)
WPWA 1590 (Chester, PA - Philadelphia area)
KIDR 740 (Phoenix, AZ)
WPES 1430 (Richmond, VA)
KKDS 1060 (Salt Lake City, UT)
KIID 1400 (San Luis Obispo, CA)
WWAX 750 (Scranton, PA)
KAZZ 107.1 (Spokane, WA)
WFUN-FM 95.5 (Bethalto, IL-St. Louis, MO)
KMYZ 1570 (Tulsa, OK)
KAHS 1590 (Ventura/Thousand Oaks CA)
KAHS 850 (Ventura/Thousand Oaks CA)
WKDL 1050 (Washington, DC)
WOHZ 1600 (Wheeling, WV)
WMXH 750 (Wilks-Barre/Scranton, PA)

References

External links
 Radiotapes.com Airchecks of WWTC radio formats dating back to 1972 including Radio Aahs and more.

Defunct radio networks in the United States
Franchised radio formats
Mass media companies disestablished in 1998
Mass media companies established in 1990
Defunct mass media companies of the United States
1990 establishments in Minnesota
1998 disestablishments in Minnesota